St. Paul's College is a private Distance Education Institute located in Ghatkopar, Mumbai, India. The college was founded in 1978 by Sebastian Alummoottil who was a professor in a College of Mumbai University.
It offers recognized Under Graduate , Post Graduate and  Diploma courses in the following subjects:
 Arts
 Science
 Commerce
 Management
 Education
 Computer Science, 
 Information Technology
 Library Science 
 Social work 
 Law 
 Travel 
 Fashion Design

External links
Official site

Universities and colleges in Mumbai
Distance education institutions based in India
Educational institutions established in 1978
1978 establishments in Maharashtra